Glen David VanHerck  (born October 20, 1962) is a general in the United States Air Force, who serves as the commander of both United States Northern Command and the North American Aerospace Defense Command. He previously served as Director of the Joint Staff from August 2019 to August 2020. He assumed his current assignment on August 20, 2020.

VanHerck was born in Murray, Kentucky, and raised in Bismarck, Missouri. He graduated from the University of Missouri, where he was commissioned through the Air Force Reserve Officer Training Corps in 1987.

Awards and decorations

Effective dates of promotion

References

1962 births
Living people
University of Missouri alumni
United States Air Force generals
Recipients of the Defense Distinguished Service Medal
Recipients of the Air Force Distinguished Service Medal
Recipients of the Defense Superior Service Medal
Recipients of the Legion of Merit
People from Murray, Kentucky
Military personnel from Kentucky